Pakhanpura is a village situated in Bhawarnkol Block in Ghazipur district of Uttar Pradesh, India. The village lies 29 km east of Ghazipur,  from Bhawarnkol, and … from the State capital Lucknow. The village has one post office. The population of the village is approximately 20,000 people

References 

Villages in Ghazipur district